İnci Türkay (born July 15, 1972) is a Turkish actress who is best known for playing "Betüş" in Sihirli Annem (My Magical Mom).

She completed her education in the theatre program at Hacettepe University Ankara State Conservatory, and later worked in the Trabzon State Theatre.

In 2001, she began her television career with "Dünya Varmış". Then, she acted the leading role in Sihirli Annem. She starred together with Nevra Serezli in this television series. 
  
In 2004, she married a businessman named Ahmet Eroglu. She has a son named Ali. At the beginning of 2009, she established a toy store called "Tayga Toys". She divorced her husband in 2009. In September 2019, she married Atilla Saral, with whom she had been in a relationship for 11 years.

Filmography

References

External links

1972 births
Hacettepe University Ankara State Conservatory alumni
Actresses from İzmir
Turkish film actresses
Turkish television actresses
Living people